Liboi Airport  is an airport serving the town of Liboi in the Garissa County of Kenya.

Location
The coordinates of this airport are 0°21'14.0"N, 40°52'40.0"E (Latitude:0.353889; Longitude:40.877778).

Overview

See also

 List of airports in Kenya
 Transport in Kenya

References

External links
 Liboi Airport (LBK) at World Airport Codes
  Liboi Airport (LBK) Overview at Flightstats.com

Airports in Kenya
Garissa County
Transport in Kenya